Felix Prangenberg (born May 25, 1998) is a German BMX rider who won silver medal in BMX Street at the 2019 X Games in Shanghai. Including the gold (Real BMX Video) and silver (BMX Street) UCI BMX World Championships at the X Games near San Diego and won the bronze medal in the 2021 men's race. He competed in world championships.

References

External links
 Wethepeople profile

Living people
1998 births
BMX riders
German male cyclists
X Games athletes
People from Neuwied
Cyclists from Rhineland-Palatinate